KLUE (103.5 FM, "KLUE 103.5") is a radio station broadcasting a Contemporary Hit Radio music format. Licensed to Poplar Bluff, Missouri, United States, the station is currently owned by Benjamin Stratemeyer and features live and local programming.

History
The Federal Communications Commission issued a construction permit for the station to Twin Eagle Communications on October 26, 1990. The station was assigned the call sign KZMA on December 12, 1990, and received its license to cover on February 2, 1999. On April 26, 2002, Twin Eagle assigned the station's license to the current owner, Benjamin Stratemeyer, at a price of $800,000. On March 27, 2003, the station changed its call sign to the current KLUE.

References

External links

LUE
Contemporary hit radio stations in the United States
Radio stations established in 1999
1999 establishments in Missouri